Stainsacre is a village in the civil parish of Hawsker-cum-Stainsacre in the Scarborough district of North Yorkshire on the edge of the North York Moors National Park.

The village's population in 1809 was 144.

Stainsacre was the seat of Jonathan Sanders, a merchant. By 1884, W.H. Attley lived in Stainsacre Hall. Stainsacre Hall was owned by Middlesbrough Borough Council and they used it as an educational and activity centre until 2010, before it was sold due to cost and dwindling numbers attending.

Hawsker railway station served Stainsacre until it closed in 1965.

The Parish Church is dedicated to All Saints.

References

External links

Stainsacre Hall Website

Villages in North Yorkshire